Diocese of Kotayk ( Kotayki t'em), is a diocese of the Armenian Apostolic Church covering the Kotayk Province of Armenia. The name is derived from the historic Kotayk canton of Ayrarat province of Armenia Major.

The diocese was officially founded on May 30, 1996, upon a kontakion issued by Catholicos Karekin I. The diocesan headquarters are located in the provincial capital Hrazdan, while the cathedral of the diocese is the Kecharis Monastery in the nearby town of Tsaghkadzor.

History
The Diocese of Kotayk is considered the successor of the historic Diocese of Bjni founded by Catholicos Peter I in 1031. Bjni was one of the largest dioceses of medieval Armenia. The bishop of Bjni was one of 4 bishops that possessed a special privilege in the election of the Catholicos of All Armenians, others being the bishops of Syunik, Haghpat and Artaz.

The Diocese of Bjni has been intact until the mid 18th century.

Active churches
Here is the list of churches, monasteries and chapels functioning under the jurisdiction of the Diocese of Kotayk, along with their location and year of consecration:

Churches

 Surp Kiraki Church, Arzni, 6th century
 Surp Sarkis Church, Bjni, 7th century
 Surp Hovhannes Church, Alapars, 7th century
 Surp Vartan Zoravar Church, Alapars, 901
 Holy Mother of God Church, Bjni, 1031
 Mashtots Hayrapet Church, Garni, 12th century
 Holy Mother of God Church, Yeghvard, 1301
 Kaptavank Church, Kaputan, 1349
 Holy Mother of God Church, Garni, 17th century
 Surp Stepanos Church, Abovyan, 1851
 Surp Karapet Church, Akunk, 1855
 Holy Cross Church, Hrazdan, 1861
 Surp Hakob Church, Aramus, 1863
 Holy Mother of God Church, Fantan, 19th century
 Holy Mother of God Church, Solak, 19th century
 Holy Mother of God Church, Meghradzor, 1881 
 Holy Mother of God Church, Hrazdan, 1883
 Saint George's Church, Argel, 1890
 Surp Hovhannes Church, Arinj, 1890
 Holy Mother of God Church, Jrvezh, 1891
 Holy Mother of God Church, Alapars, 1897
 Holy Saviour's Church, Charentsavan, 2000
 Surp Harutyun Church, Nurnus, 2001
 Holy Mother of God Church, Arinj, 2002
 Holy Martyrs Church, Teghenik, 2003
 Tukh Manuk Church, Hrazdan, 2003
 Saint John the Baptist Church, Abovyan, 2013
 Saint George's Church, Hrazdan, 2013
 Holy Saviour's Church, Nor Hachn, 2015
 Holy Cross Church, Garni, 2015
 Surp Sarkis Church, Yeghvard, 2017

Monasteries
Geghard Monastery near Goght, 4th century, with the Katoghike Chapel dating back to 1215
Dzagavank Monastery near Getargel, consisted of 2 churches: Surp Nshan Church of the 7the century, and the belfry chapel of the 14th century
Makravank Monastery, Hrazdan, consisted of 2 churches: the Holy Saviour's Church of the 10th century and the Holy Mother of God Church of the 13th century
Kecharis Monastery, Tsaghkadzor, consisted of 3 churches and 2 chapels: Saint Grigor Church of 1013, Surp Nshan Church of the 11th century, Katoghike Church of the 13th century, Chapel of Saint Grigor of the 11th century, and the Chapel of Surp Harutyun of 1220

Chapels

 Tsaghkevank Chapel, Teghenik, 7-8th centuries
 Karmravor Chapel, Arinj, 13th century
 Tukh Manuk Chapel, Arinj, 13th century
 Holy Mother of God Chapel, Aramus, 13-14th centuries
 Holy Mother of God Chapel, Arinj, 15th century
 Tukh Manuk Chapel, Alapars, 19th century
 Surp Karapet Chapel, Arinj, 20th century
 Blue Cross Chapel, Hrazdan, 1996
 Saint Barbara's Chapel, Balahovit, 1999
 Saint Vartan Chapel, Byureghavan, 2000
 Holy Cross Chapel, Ptghni, 2005
 Surp Narek Chapel, Kotayk, 2006
 Saint Gregory Chapel, Zar, 2008
 Holy Mother of God Chapel, Dzoraghbyur, 2010
 Tukh Manuk Chapel, Argel, 2013

Inactive/ruined churches and monasteries
This is an incomplete list of inactive or ruined churches and monasteries in the territory regulated by the Diocese of Kotayk:

 Yeghvard Basilica, Yeghvard, 4th century
 Khumarazham Church, Garni, 4-5th centuries
 Kakavadzor Upper Chapel, Hrazdan, 4-7th centuries
 Surp Nshan Tsiranavor Church, Aramus, 6th century
 Ptghnavank Monastery, Ptghni, 6-7th centuries
 Monastery of the Apostles Matthew and Andrew, Karenis, 6-7th centuries
 Artavaz Monastery, Artavaz, 6-7th centuries
 Teghenyats Monastery, Buzhakan, 6-7th centuries
 Gharghavank Church, Zoravan, 7th century
 Saint George's Monastery near Argel, 7th century
 Holy Zion Church, Garni, 7th century
 Mayravank Monastery, Solak, 7-11th century
 Holy Cross Church, Bjni, 9th century
 Surp Stepanos Church of Aghbyurak, Hrazdan, 10-12th centuries
 Neghuts Monastery, Arzakan, 10-13th centuries 
 Holy Right Monastery, Hrazdan, 10-14th centuries
 Tejharuyk Monastery, Meghradzor, 1199
 Monastery of Saints Paul and Peter, Akunk, 12-13th centuries
 Holy Mother of God Church, Garni, 12-13th centuries
 Chorut Monastery, Arzakan, 1207
 Zoravan Church, Zoravan, 13th century
 Saint George's Church, Bjni, 13th century
 Saint George's Church, Arzakan, 13-14th century
 Kakavadzor Chapel, Hrazdan, 18-19th centuries
 Surp Karapet Church of Jrarat, Hrazdan, 1831
 Surp Stepanos Church, Arzakan, 1867
 Holy Mother of God Church, Goght, 19th century

References

External links
Churches of Kkotayk Province 

Kotayk
Christianity in Armenia
Kotayk Province
Oriental Orthodox dioceses in Armenia